The 2001 La Flèche Wallonne was the 65th edition of La Flèche Wallonne cycle race and was held on 18 April 2001. The race started in Charleroi and finished in Huy. The race was won by Rik Verbrugghe of the Lotto team.

General classification

References

2001 in road cycling
2001
2001 in Belgian sport